"Terryfold" is a song written by American actor, voice actor, and animator Justin Roiland and recorded by American indie pop band Chaos Chaos. The song also features vocals from Roiland. It was released onto music streaming platforms and made available for digital download on August 27, 2017. The song was created for the American animated comedy series Rick and Morty, and was played during "Rest and Ricklaxation", the sixth episode of the series' third season.

Background
The song played twice during "Rest and Ricklaxation", the sixth episode of the third season of Rick and Morty. The title characters, Rick and Morty, hear and enjoy the song as it plays over a radio. The song also played during the episode's credits.

Critical reception
Nerdist commented that the song was "perhaps the most bizarre comedic counterweight" of the episode, and added that "the minimal R&B-leaning song is actually pretty fun musically, like a ridiculous mix of Vulfpeck, Mac DeMarco, and Midnite Vultures era Beck. The main draw, though, are the lyrics, which are almost exclusively about grabbing 'Terry fold flaps,' 'flappy folds,' 'foldy flaps,' and other variations on the theme." Vulture called the song "semi-sweet, questionable, and strangely soothing."

Chart performance
Roiland had posted tweets expressing his hope for the song to chart and gain radio airplay. The song debuted at #1 on the Comedy Digital Song Sales chart dated September 16, 2017, after a sum of 2,000 downloads. According to Nielsen Music, the song accumulated 1.1 million U.S. streams and sold 1,000 downloads in the week ending September 7, 2017. As a result, the song debuted at #33 on the Billboard Hot Rock Songs chart dated September 23, 2017.

Track listing

Personnel
Justin Roiland – lyrics, vocals, artwork
Chaos Chaos – additional vocals, songwriting
Phil Levine – drum engineering and mixing
Troupe Gammage – mixing, mastering

Charts

References 

2017 singles
2017 songs
Comedy songs
Dream pop songs
Indie pop songs
Rick and Morty
Songs from animated series